Sharon Angela Gibson (born 31 December 1961 in Mapperley, Nottinghamshire) is a female retired English athlete who competed in the women's javelin throw event during her career.

Athletics career
Gibson twice represented Great Britain at the Summer Olympics: 1984 and 1988. Gibson was affiliated with the Notts Athletic Club. She represented England in the javelin event, at the 1982 Commonwealth Games in Brisbane, Queensland, Australia. Eight years later she represented England in the javelin again and finished fourth, at the 1990 Commonwealth Games in Auckland, New Zealand. A further four years later and at her third Commonwealth games she finally won a medal when winning the bronze at the 1994 Commonwealth Games in Victoria, in the province of British Columbia in Canada.

International competitions

References 

 

1961 births
Living people
Sportspeople from Nottingham
English female javelin throwers
British female javelin throwers
Olympic athletes of Great Britain
Athletes (track and field) at the 1984 Summer Olympics
Athletes (track and field) at the 1988 Summer Olympics
Commonwealth Games medallists in athletics
Commonwealth Games bronze medallists for England
Athletes (track and field) at the 1982 Commonwealth Games
Athletes (track and field) at the 1990 Commonwealth Games
Athletes (track and field) at the 1994 Commonwealth Games
World Athletics Championships athletes for Great Britain
People from Mapperley
Sportspeople from Nottinghamshire
Medallists at the 1994 Commonwealth Games